Glanville is a north western suburb of Adelaide, in the City of Port Adelaide Enfield.

History
In 1846 Captain John Hart settled near Port Adelaide on a private subdivision of section 908 of the Hundred of Port Adelaide. Hart's permanent residence was built on the subdivision in 1856. Hart named the residence Glanville Hall for his mother, Mary née Glanville, and the land division was known as Glanville Hall Estate. The suburb of Glanville was formally established on a portion of the Glanville Hall Estate subdivision in 1951 after the name was proposed in 1945.

See also 
 Glanville railway station
 District Council of Glanville

References

Suburbs of Adelaide
Lefevre Peninsula